The 2000 Minnesota Senate election was held in the U.S. state of Minnesota on November 7, 2000, to elect members to the Senate of the 82nd Minnesota Legislature. A primary election was held on September 12, 2000.

The Minnesota Democratic–Farmer–Labor Party (DFL) won a majority of seats, remaining the majority party, followed by the Republican Party of Minnesota and one independent. The new Legislature convened on January 3, 2001.

Results

See also
 Minnesota House of Representatives election, 2000
 Minnesota gubernatorial election, 1998

References

2000 Minnesota elections
Minnesota
Minnesota Senate elections